The Joke's On Us! is a Canadian game show that aired from September 1983 to 1984. It was hosted by Monty Hall, joined by Sylvie Garant as assistant very early on in the run, with Sandy Hoyt as the show's announcer. Taped at Showline Milton Stage in Toronto, Ontario in association with the Global Television Network, the show was created and produced by two American game show veterans, Willie Stein and Nat Ligerman. Each episode featured a rotating panel of four comedians, which included such famous personalities of the day as Alan Thicke, Nipsey Russell, Arte Johnson and Jo Anne Worley.

Rules
The show pitted two contestants against each other. Each took turns listening to a joke told by one member of the panel, while the other panel members each delivered a different punchline to the joke. The contestant had to determine which of the punchlines was the original punchline to the joke; if correct, that player scored; otherwise, the points went to his/her opponent. Values were 5 points in round 1, 10 points in round 2, and 50 points in the 3rd and final round (which was played slightly differently from the first two: Monty himself read the joke, 3 of the panelists supplied punchlines, and both contestants guessed on the same joke. The 4th panelist revealed the correct punchline). The player with the most points at the end of this round won the game and $250; in the event of a tie, a tie-breaker was played in the same way as a high-low question on Card Sharks.

Later episodes featured an all-cash format where correct answers were worth $25 in round 1 and $50 in round 2. The final joke was worth $100. Unlike the first format, the opponent did not score for an incorrect answer.

Add-a-Word Round
The winner played the "Add-a-Word" bonus round, based on an old party game. A phrase such as "I always forget my..." would appear on a board, under which eight letters would be uncovered one at a time. The celebrities had to go around twice adding a word to the chain that began with the next letter. For the above example, if "A" were uncovered, the first celebrity might say "I always forget my apples." Then if a "B" were uncovered, the second would have to say "I always forget my apples and my balloons." This would continue for all eight letters.

If the celebrity could not remember a previous word, the contestant could tell them. After all eight words were given, the contestant then had to repeat the entire phrase. The celebrities could not tell the contestant the next word, but could mime or gesture to assist. The contestant had 60 seconds to build the chain and repeat it in order to win $500.

The enforcement of the rules was not always strict, and celebrities occasionally gave the wrong word while building the chain or gave verbal clues while the contestants were trying to repeat the chain.

Music
Milton DeLugg provided the theme song, which had previously been used as a cue on various Chuck Barris game shows.

Reruns
The series was repeated on Global later in the 1980s, followed by a run on DejaView from 2002 to 2004, and later aired on GameTV from 2007 to 2010.

1980s Canadian game shows
1980s Canadian comedy television series
Global Television Network original programming
1983 Canadian television series debuts
1984 Canadian television series endings
Television series by Corus Entertainment
Television shows filmed in Toronto
English-language television shows